5,000,000 (*Tortelvis Fans Can't Be Wrong) is Dread Zeppelin's second full-length album. Recorded in early fall 1990, it was conceived and recorded during a three-week break from touring to support the surprisingly successful Un-Led-Ed. Produced by Jah Paul Jo and Rasta Li-Mon, the album once again featured their patented "Zeppelin-Inna-Reggae-Style" hybrid plus 3 original songs and a cover of Bob Marley's "Stir It Up" and "Train Kept A-Rollin'" by The Yardbirds. The album was released worldwide by I.R.S. Records in 1991.

The title is a reference to the Elvis Presley album 50,000,000 Elvis Fans Can't Be Wrong. The cover image is an homage to the Led Zeppelin album Led Zeppelin IV.

"Stairway to Heaven" and "Stir It Up"
A Led Zeppelin song notable for its inclusion on 5,000,000* is "Stairway to Heaven." Producer/guitarist Jah Paul Jo had said that they left the Zeppelin classic off of Un Led-Ed on purpose so people would have to buy the second album, too.

"Stairway to Heaven" was edited to be released as a single in the UK (vinyl and CD format). It was also offered as a 3" CD in Japan. Dread Zeppelin's version of Elvis Presley's "Jailhouse Rock" is the B-side of the UK single.

A video to promote "Stairway to Heaven" was proposed but never finished due to copyright considerations. The concept was a take-off on the Japanese film, "King Kong Versus Godzilla." This time, it was going to be a gargantuan Tortelvis fighting Godzilla. Many of Dread Zeppelin's 1991 Japanese performances were filmed for inclusion in the video, but it was never completed.

"Stir It Up" by Bob Marley also got the Dread Zeppelin treatment. "Stir it up, Charlie... put it in a blender and get real gone," vocalist Tortelvis is heard to mutter on the fade. The song also features electric sitar and a Moog Synthesizer the band claimed to find in Dave Stewart's (Eurythmics) attic.

A video of "Stir It Up" was released in 1991 to promote the album. In it, various members of Dread Zeppelin appear as themselves and also as a backup singing group (The Michael Jordanaires) and Tortelvis as Bingo Master in Lederhosen at an Elk's Lodge.

Album cover

Whereas Led Zeppelin had the picture of a mystic man holding sticks on the cover of Led Zeppelin IV, Dread Zeppelin featured Tortelvis' towel and water man, Charlie Haj holding various pool cues and cleaning gear. The inside of the album is a telethon with people manning the telephones and the band posing beside a large-size mock up of a  check. The credits for the album are pictured as a tear-stained thank-you speech presumably never given.

In the USA, the cover is in color on the outside but black and white on the inside. UK and Japanese versions are full color inside and out.

In the UK, the album was released on vinyl and CD.

Track listing

Personnel
 Carl Jah – Guitars and Background Vocals
 Jah Paul Jo – Guitars, Keyboard and Background Vocals
 Put-Mon – Porn Bass and Background Vocals
 Tortelvis – Lead Vocals
 Ed Zeppelin – Conga, Percussion & Toast
 Fresh Cheese 'n' Cheese – Drums
 I-Lar-E Treadwell – Larry's Tower and Vocal Introduction On "Forgettin' About Business," Balalaika on "When the Levee Breaks"
 Bun-E Slopes – Blues Harp on "When the Levee Breaks" and "Train Kept A-Rollin'"
 The Dreadettes – Background Vocals
 Michael Jordanaires – Background Vocals

Production
Producers: Jah Paul Jo, Rasta Li-Mon
Engineer: Rasta Li-Mon
Art direction: Hugh Brown
Photography: Hugh Brown
Charlie Haj is the man who hands Tortelvis his water and towels on stage.

Release formats
CD: 1991 UK (IRS EIRSACD 1057)
CD: 1991 US (IRS X2-13092)
CD: 1991 JP (JVC VICP-5053)
CS: 1991 UK (IRS EIRSAC 1057)
CS: 1991 US (IRS X4-13092)
LP: 1991 UK (IRS EIRSA 1057)

References

External links 
The Making Of 5,000,000 Tortelvis Fans Can't Be Wrong By Jah Paul Jo
Spin Magazine Review, 1991
Satan Stole My Teddy Bear Review, January 2002

Dread Zeppelin albums
1991 albums
I.R.S. Records albums